Seven-colour tea or seven-layer tea is a Bangladeshi beverage made with an unknown recipe. The Seven-layer tea was invented by Romesh Ram Gour after discovering that different tea leaves have different densities. Each layer contrasts in colour and taste, ranging from syrupy sweet to spicy clove. The result is an alternating dark/light band pattern throughout the drink, giving the tea its name. The original seven-colour tea is mainly available in the Nilkantha Tea Cabin, a tea shop in Srimongol, Moulvibazar, with other variants existing throughout different parts of Bangladesh.

History
 Qatari ambassador to Bangladesh, Ahmed bin Mohamed al-Dehaimi, tasted the seven-coloured tea during his visit to Srimangal.
 Romesh Ram Gour  was compensated Tk 7000 (BDT) for a cup of seven-layered tea as a reward by the Qatari ambassador.

Gallery

See also
 Tea production in Bangladesh
 Economy of Sylhet

References

 

Tea production
Tea industry in Bangladesh
Tea in Asia
Bangladeshi cuisine
Bangladeshi drinks
Srimangal Upazila
Sylheti cuisine
Economy of Sylhet